Gustav Adolph, Duke of Mecklenburg [-Güstrow] (26 February 1633 – 6 October 1695) was the last ruler of Mecklenburg-Güstrow from 1636 until his death and last Lutheran Administrator of the Prince-Bishopric of Ratzeburg from 1636 to 1648.

Life
Gustav Adolph was born at the ducal residence in Güstrow, the son of Duke John Albert II and his third wife Eleonore Marie (1600–1657), daughter of Prince Christian I of Anhalt-Bernburg.

As Gustav Adolph was a minor when his father died in 1636, his uncle Duke Adolph Frederick I of Mecklenburg-Schwerin at first became regent at Güstrow. This was fiercely opposed by Gustav Adolph's mother. In 1654 he came of age and married Magdalene Sibylle, a daughter of Duke Frederick III of Holstein-Gottorp. Their marriage produced eleven children:
 Johann, Hereditary Prince of Mecklenburg-Güstrow (2 December 1655 – 6 February 1660).
 Eleonore (1 June 1657 – 24 February 1672).
 Marie (June 19, 1659 – 6 January 1701), married on 23 September 1684 to Duke Adolph Frederick II of Mecklenburg-Strelitz.
 Magdalene (5 July 1660 – 19 February 1702).
 Sophie (21 June 1662 – 1 June 1738), married on 6 December 1700 to Duke Christian Ulrich I of Württemberg-Oels.
 Christine (14 August 1663 – 3 August 1749), married on 4 May 1683 to Louis Christian, Count of Stolberg-Gedern.
 Charles, Hereditary Prince of Mecklenburg-Güstrow (18 November 1664 – 15 March 1688), married on 10 August 1687 to Marie Amalie of Brandenburg, a daughter of Elector Frederick William.
 Hedwig (12 January 1666 – 9 August 1735), married on 1 December 1686 to Duke August of Saxe-Merseburg-Zörbig.
 Louise (28 August 1667 – 15 March 1721), married on 5 December 1696 to King Frederick IV of Denmark.
 Elisabeth (3 September 1668 – 25 August 1738), married on 29 March 1692 to Duke Henry of Saxe-Merseburg-Spremberg.
 Augusta (27 December 1674 – 19 May 1756).

The death of the only surviving son, the Hereditary Prince Charles, in 1688 at the age of 23, caused a succession crisis in Mecklenburg-Güstrow. Gustav Adolph's daughter Marie married her cousin Adolphus Frederick II of Mecklenburg, who after the death of his father-in-law claimed the Güstrow heritage, but could not prevail against the ruling duke of Mecklenburg-Schwerin. A younger daughter, Louise in 1695 married the Danish crown prince Frederick IV and in 1699 became queen consort of Denmark.

Gustav Adolph died in Güstrow at the age of 62. The subsequent inheritance conflict within the House of Mecklenburg was settled by the establishment of the Duchy of Mecklenburg-Strelitz in 1701.

References

1633 births
1695 deaths
House of Mecklenburg
Dukes of Mecklenburg-Güstrow
Lutheran Prince-Bishops of Ratzeburg